Charles deWolf Gibson (born March 9, 1943) is an American broadcast television anchor, journalist and podcaster. Gibson was a host of Good Morning America from 1987 to 1998 and again from 1999 to 2006, and the anchor of World News with Charles Gibson from 2006 to 2009.

In 1965, Gibson worked as the news director for Princeton University's student-run radio station, a radio producer for RKO, and a reporter for local television stations. In 1975, he joined ABC News, where he worked as a general assignment reporter and a correspondent from Washington, D.C.

Early life and education
Gibson was born on March 9, 1943, in Evanston, Illinois, to Georgianna Law and Burdett Gibson, and is a great-nephew of graphic artist Charles Dana Gibson. He grew up in Washington, D.C. and attended the Sidwell Friends School, a private college-preparatory school in Washington.

In 1965, Gibson graduated with an A.B. in history from Princeton University, where he was News Director for WPRB-FM, the university radio station, and a member of Princeton Tower Club. Gibson completed a senior thesis titled "The Land and Capital Problems of Pre-Famine Ireland." In 1966, he served in the United States Coast Guard.

Career

Early career
Gibson joined RKO General in 1966 as a producer and later worked as a reporter and anchor for WLVA (now WSET) television in Lynchburg, Virginia. In 1970, he moved to WMAL-TV (now WJLA) television, the ABC network affiliate in Washington, D.C. Gibson joined the syndicated news service Television News Inc. (TVN) in 1974. For TVN, he covered the Watergate scandal investigations and the resignation of President Richard Nixon.

ABC News

Field correspondent
Gibson joined ABC News in 1975, where he worked as its White House correspondent from 1976 to 1977, a general assignment reporter from 1977 to 1981, and House of Representatives correspondent from 1981 to 1987. Gibson was a correspondent and fill-in anchor for World News Tonight with Peter Jennings  anchored ABC World News Saturday and substitute anchor on the late-night hard and soft news program Nightline and World News This Morning.

Good Morning America

On February 23, 1987, Gibson first became a co-anchor of Good Morning America, alongside Joan Lunden. From 1985 to 1995, Good Morning America was the most-watched morning show on American television.

Gibson hosted and narrated the Maryland Public Television documentary Lucky Number, a program about problem gambling, in 1990.

During the 1992 presidential campaign, Vice President Dan Quayle used part of an interview between Gibson and Reform Party candidate Ross Perot to claim that Perot displayed contempt towards the United States Constitution. On the October 22, 1991, edition of Good Morning America, Gibson asked Perot what Perot would advise President George H. W. Bush to do to "jump-start the economy". Perot stated that the U.S. helped Germany and Japan write their respective nations' constitutions: "This was at a time when the industrial revolution had occurred. Our Constitution was written 200 years ago, before it occurred." He added that those nations "have an intelligent relationship between business and government." Vice President Quayle responded: "Mr. Perot, we do not need a new constitution. Our Constitution has served us well." When Gibson interviewed Democratic presidential candidate and then-Governor of Arkansas Bill Clinton on June 28, 1992, The New York Times noted that Gibson repeatedly pressed Clinton to name his vice presidential candidate. Gibson interviewed President Bush on October 9 that year; Bush stated that he questioned Clinton's judgment, not patriotism, in traveling to the Soviet Union in 1969.

On May 1, 1998, Gibson left the program and ABC replaced him with Kevin Newman. Newman began hosting Good Morning America on May 4, 1998. Good Morning America then began losing viewers to NBC's Today show. In May 1996, Good Morning America averaged 4.17 million viewers daily, and Today averaged 4.43 million; that gap expanded to 3.12 for Good Morning America and 5.26 for Today. ABC reinstated Gibson to Good Morning America on January 18, 1999, with Diane Sawyer as co-host.  He remained as co-anchor until June 28, 2006, when he left to anchor World News Tonight, after having spent 19 years with the morning program.  In 1998 and 1999, he was a co-anchor, with Connie Chung, on the Monday edition of the ABC newsmagazine program 20/20.

On September 11, 2001, Gibson was anchoring Good Morning America with Diane Sawyer when coverage of the World Trade Center attacks began. Both anchors turned coverage over to colleague Peter Jennings moments after the second plane hit the South Tower.

During the 2004 U.S. presidential-election campaign, Gibson moderated the second presidential debate in St. Louis, Missouri, between the two nominee candidates – Republican incumbent U.S. President George W. Bush and Democratic U.S. Senator John Kerry. That debate took place on October 8, 2004.

World News with Charles Gibson

In the summer of 2005, Gibson began substitute anchoring World News Tonight (its name at the time) regularly after long-time anchor Peter Jennings's treatment for lung cancer prevented him from anchoring.  On August 7, 2005, Gibson announced Jennings's death and the following day anchored World News Tonight, and was eventually offered the job.

Though Gibson was a leading choice to replace Jennings, he could not agree with David Westin, President of ABC News, over how long he would be anchor.  On January 2, 2006, Elizabeth Vargas and Bob Woodruff, veteran ABC News journalists, were chosen to be Jennings's permanent replacements.  They had both been interim anchors. Vargas had been designated by Peter Jennings as only favored choice as back up anchor on September 11, 2001.

Following Woodruff's severe injury on January 29, 2006, while on assignment in Iraq, and Vargas's announcement that she was pregnant, some critics questioned whether Vargas could sustain the program on her own, pointing to falling ratings. In July 2006, Cindy Adams of the New York Post reported that Gibson would become Woodruff's "Temporary Permanent Replacement" on World News Tonight. According to some reports, while GMA co-host Diane Sawyer had coveted the World News Tonight anchor chair, Gibson had one year on his contract left and threatened to retire if he didn't get that position, and as GMA was ABC News' most lucrative show, it would be badly damaged if it lost both Sawyer and Gibson.

On May 23, 2006, Gibson was named sole anchor of World News Tonight, effective May 29, 2006, after Vargas announced her resignation from the program.  She cited her doctors' recommendation to reduce considerably her workload because of her upcoming maternity leave, and her wish to spend more time with her new baby. She would return to anchor 20/20.

During the summer of 2006, the program's title was changed to World News with Charles Gibson. According to The New York Times, he had previously planned to retire from ABC News on June 22, 2007, but remained to anchor the newscast.

During the 2008 U.S. presidential-election campaign, Gibson was a co-moderator with George Stephanopoulos, another ABC News journalist, for the April 16, 2008, Democratic Party's presidential-election debate in Philadelphia, Pennsylvania, between U.S. Senators Hillary Clinton and Barack Obama; it was broadcast exclusively by ABC News. Both moderators were later criticized in The Washington Post and other media outlets for their selection of insubstantial, "gotcha"-style questions. Stephanopoulos acknowledged the legitimacy of the concerns over the order of the questions, but said they were regarding issues in the campaign that had not been covered in previous debates. ABC had sought out a woman who opposed Obama and aired a video of her asking a trivial question, repeated by Stephanopolous, about why Obama wasn't wearing a flag pin. The question brought widespread criticism from the media. He moderated both the Republican and the Democratic ABC, Facebook debates at Saint Anselm College on January 5, 2008.

On September 11, 2008, Gibson interviewed Sarah Palin, the 2008 Republican vice-presidential nominee candidate, her first interview after being named as presidential nominee John McCain's running mate. The interview received criticism from some political commentators, specifically surrounding Gibson's question regarding the term 'Bush Doctrine' due to its having a variety of differing meanings.

During Gibson's tenure, World News was a solid competitor and sporadically beat NBC Nightly News, anchored by Brian Williams, in the program ratings during 2007, the first time in several years, and the ABC program became much more distant second place after he retired. The two programs have taken turns at the top of the ratings among household viewers and the 25–54 age group prized by advertisers. Katie Couric's CBS Evening News remained a distant third.  During his last few months as anchor, Gibson also worked on a special documentary about the oil industry entitled "Over a Barrel: The Truth About Oil," which was a critical and ratings success and earned him several awards.

According to reports, while ABC tried to persuade Gibson to stay on as anchor, he decided to retire. On September 2, 2009, ABC News announced that Diane Sawyer would replace Gibson at the "World News" anchor chair following his retirement from ABC News.  Gibson anchored his final edition of World News on December 18, 2009.

Recent work
In December 2010, Gibson participated as a speaker on Voices in Leadership, an original Harvard T.H. Chan School of Public Health webcast series, in a discussion titled, "Lessons Learned as an ABC News Anchor," moderated by Dr. Robert Blendon.

In 2016, he appears as a news anchor in season 4 of the Netflix original series House of Cards.

During ABC News' live presidential election coverage on November 8, 2016, Gibson appeared as a contributor.

On May 2, 2022, Gibson returned to ABC where he hosted a podcast for ABC Audio with his daughter Kate. The podcast, titled The Bookcase was designed to feature authors, book industry insiders and local independent bookstores. The first episode featured Oprah Winfrey who discussed the impact of her bookclub, how she picks her choices and her own reading habits.

Awards and honors
In 1973, the National Endowment for the Humanities awarded him a National Journalism Fellowship. The Radio Television Digital News Association awarded Gibson the Paul White Award in 2006, and in 2008 Quinnipiac University awarded him the Fred Friendly First Amendment Award.

Personal life

Gibson's wife, Arlene Gibson, is an educator who retired in 2006 as head of school at The Spence School in New York City. She has also held positions at other schools in New York City and New Jersey, and was previously the head of the middle school at the Bryn Mawr School in Baltimore, Maryland, in the 1980s. She is on the board of trustees at her alma mater, Bryn Mawr College in Bryn Mawr, Pennsylvania.

They have two daughters, Jessica and Katherine. On March 14, 2006, Jessica gave birth to Gibson's first grandchild.

Gibson has resided with his family in Summit, New Jersey.

Beginning in 2006, Gibson was a member of the board of trustees of Princeton University, until his term expired in 2015.

On May 28, 1989, Gibson delivered the commencement address at Vassar College. On May 17, 2006, Gibson delivered the commencement address at Monmouth University's class of 2006's graduation ceremony held at the PNC Bank Arts Center in Holmdel Township, New Jersey. He was also presented with a doctor of humane letters, an honorary degree.

On June 17, 2007, Gibson delivered the commencement address to the class of 2007's graduation ceremony at Union College in Schenectady, New York. Gibson also received an honorary doctor of humane letters, as well as a framed copy of his father's 1923 college yearbook entry. His father, Burdett Gibson, grew up in Schenectady and graduated from the college in 1923. Gibson contributed an estimated US$75,000 to the college to help create the Burdett Gibson Class of 1923 Scholarship, which is awarded annually to a deserving student in need.

Career timeline
1966- Gibson joined the RKO General as a producer and later worked as a reporter and anchor for WLVA (now WSET) television in Lynchburg, Virginia. In 1970, he moved to WMAL-TV (now WJLA) television, the ABC network affiliate in Washington, D.C. Gibson joined the syndicated news service Television News, Inc. (TVN) in 1974.
 1970–1973 – anchor and reporter at WJLA-TV, the ABC television-network affiliate in Washington, D.C.
 1977–1981 – general-assignment correspondent for the ABC News division of the ABC television network.
 1981–1987 – chief correspondent for the U.S. House of Representatives for ABC News.
 February 1987–May 1998; January 1999–June 2006 – co-anchor of ABC News'''s Good Morning America, a breakfast television news and talk program.
 1998–2000 – co-anchor of ABC Newss newsmagazine program 20/20
 2000–2004 – co-anchor of ABC News'''s Primetime, a television newsmagazine.
 October 2004 – moderator of a "town-hall"-style debate during the 2004 U.S. presidential-election campaign between candidates Republican U.S. President George W. Bush and Democratic U.S. Senator John Kerry.
 May 2006 – December 2009 – anchor of World News with Charles Gibson.
 January 2008 – moderator of debates between the Democratic candidates, as well as Republican candidates.
 April 2008 – co-moderator of a Democratic Party U.S. presidential-campaign debate between candidates – U.S. Senators Hillary Clinton and Barack Obama – during the 2008 Democratic Party presidential primaries.
 September 2008 – conducts the first major interview of Sarah Palin after she was named the Republican Party's U.S. vice-presidential candidate.
 September 2009 – ABC News announces Gibson's plans to retire as anchor of World News with Charles Gibson in late 2009 and that ABC News Diane Sawyer will become the World News anchor.
 December 18, 2009 – Gibson delivers his final broadcast on World News with a farewell speech.

References

External links

 Charles Gibson: ABC Honors Anchor's Career
 Charlie Gibson's Goodbye Speech on GMA – June 28, 2006
 

1943 births
Living people
ABC News personalities
American political journalists
American television news anchors
American television reporters and correspondents
People from Evanston, Illinois
People from Summit, New Jersey
Journalists from Washington, D.C.
Princeton University alumni
Sidwell Friends School alumni
Writers Guild of America Award winners
United States Coast Guard enlisted